Luka Babić (born 29 September 1991) is a Croatian professional basketball player who last played for Split of the Adriatic League and the Croatian League. Standing at  he plays the small forward position.

Career
On 16 July 2019 Babić was announced by OGM Ormanspor, newcomer in the Basketbol Süper Ligi (BSL) after its promotion.

On 31 January 2021 he signed with Split of the Adriatic League and the Croatian League.

References

External links
Luka Babić profile at aba-liga.com
Luka Babić profile at euroleague.net
Luka Babić profile at draftexpress.com
Luka Babić profile at kkcedevita.hr
Luka Babić profile at fiba.com

1991 births
Living people
2014 FIBA Basketball World Cup players
ABA League players
Basketball players at the 2016 Summer Olympics
Basketball players from Split, Croatia
Croatian expatriate basketball people in Germany
Croatian expatriate basketball people in Turkey
Croatian men's basketball players
İstanbul Büyükşehir Belediyespor basketball players
KK Cedevita players
KK Split players
OGM Ormanspor players
Olympic basketball players of Croatia
Ratiopharm Ulm players
Small forwards